HMS M4 may refer to the following ships of the Royal Navy:

 , a monitor originally named M4
 , the fourth M-class submarine

See also
 , a Swedish Royal Navy M-type minesweeper; see List of mine warfare vessels of the Swedish Navy
 HSwMS Carlskrona (M04) (1980), a Swedish Royal Navy minelayer

Royal Navy ship names